Micromyrtus placoides is a plant species of the family Myrtaceae endemic to Western Australia.

It is found on plains, hills and ridges in a small area in the Mid West region of Western Australia between Geraldton and Cue where it grows in gravelly sandy or clay soils over laterite or granite.

References

placoides
Endemic flora of Western Australia
Myrtales of Australia
Rosids of Western Australia
Vulnerable flora of Australia
Plants described in 2006
Taxa named by Barbara Lynette Rye